Wu Guiying (born February 1966) is a Chinese politician and the current communist party secretary of Changsha, the top political position in the city.

Early life and education
Wu was born in Tangshan, Hebei, in February 1966. She earned her master's degree in economic law from China University of Political Science and Law in 1990. After university, she was recruited as a legal adviser at a milk company in southern suburbs of Beijing.

Career in Beijing
Wu joined the Communist Party of China in April 1987, and began his political career in April 1991, where she entered the Beijing Administration for Industry and Commerce. She was deputy director of Beijing Municipal Planning Commission between November 2001 and September 2003 and deputy director of Beijing Municipal Development and Reform Commission between September 2003 and May 2008. In May 2008, she became the vice governor of Chaoyang District, rising to governor in July 2012. She concurrently served as director of Beijing Central Business District Management Committee from September 2008 to December 2012. In September 2015, she was promoted again to become communist party secretary, the top political position in the district.

Career in Hunan
In January 2018, she was transferred from her job in Beijing to central Hunan province. She was appointed vice governor of Hunan, heading education, health and medical security work. On 10 February 2021, she named communist party secretary of Changsha, her first foray into a provincial capital city leadership role. At the same time, she was admitted to member of the standing committee of the CPC Hunan Provincial Committee, the province's top authority.

References

1966 births
Living people
Politicians from Tangshan
China University of Political Science and Law alumni
People's Republic of China politicians from Hebei
Chinese Communist Party politicians from Hebei